Simone Rabbi (born 30 October 2001) is an Italian football player who plays as a forward for  club SPAL.

Club career
He was raised in the youth teams of Bologna and started playing for their Under-19 squad in the 2018–19 season.

He made his debut for Bologna's senior squad on 25 November 2020 in a Coppa Italia game against Spezia. He made his Serie A debut on 5 December 2020 against Inter.

On 26 August 2021, he was loaned to Serie C club Piacenza.

On 30 June 2022, Rabbi signed a four-year contract with SPAL.

International career
He was first called up to represent his country in August 2018 for Under-18 team friendlies.

References

External links
 

2001 births
Living people
Footballers from Bologna
Italian footballers
Association football forwards
Serie A players
Serie C players
Bologna F.C. 1909 players
Piacenza Calcio 1919 players
S.P.A.L. players
Italy youth international footballers